Ivor Wynne Jones (1927 – 1 April 2007) was a Welsh journalist.

Wynne Jones was born in the Liverpool suburb of Allerton.  He served in World War II as a paratrooper, and later joined the Forces Broadcasting Service in Jerusalem.  Finally, he worked in broadcasting in Cyprus before returning to the UK in 1948.

Jones was editor of the Caernarvon and Denbigh Herald before joining the Liverpool Daily Post, to which he contributed for 52 years.  He was the paper's chief foreign correspondent.  His weekly column, which continued to appear until two months before his death, was entitled "Forthright and Fearless".

He was also a founder member of the Lewis Carroll Society.

He died in hospital at Colwyn Bay.

Works
Llandudno Regina, the Queen of Welsh Resorts (1973)
Shipwrecks of North Wales (1986)
The Llechwedd Strike of 1893 (1993)
Colwyn Bay: a Brief History (1995)
Gold, Frankincense and Manure (1997)
Alice's Welsh Wonderland (1999)
Hitler’s Celtic Echo
Victorian Slate Mining (2003)

Sources
Obituary
BBC website

1927 births
2007 deaths
British journalists
British expatriates in Mandatory Palestine
British expatriates in Cyprus